Malmbäck is a locality situated in Nässjö Municipality, Jönköping County, Sweden with 1,031 inhabitants in 2010.

References

External links 

Populated places in Jönköping County
Populated places in Nässjö Municipality